Iuliia Mendel is a Ukrainian journalist and political advisor. She was the press secretary in the administration of Ukrainian president Volodymyr Zelenskyy from June 3, 2019 until July 9, 2021.

Biography 

She graduated from Taras Shevchenko National University of Kyiv and is a candidate of philological sciences. In June 2008, she graduated from the Institute of Philology of KNU, where she studied English and Polish, Ukrainian language and literature. In 2012, she defended her PhD thesis on The natural philosophical metalogy of Volodymyr Zatulyviter's lyrics in the context of poetry of 1970-90.

She worked as a journalist for ICTV, Espreso TV, 112 Ukraine and Inter TV channels. Iuliia Mendel became the first Ukrainian journalist to win the World Press Institute program.

She had previously worked as a Communications Consultant at the World Bank, and had contributed journalistic reporting for The New York Times. Mendel had worked as a journalist for several other media outlets that includes work for Politico Europe, the Atlantic Council, Vice,  Spiegel Online, and Forbes. 

In April 2016, she was the producer of the first documentary about post-traumatic stress disorder, Shell-Shocked: Ukraine's Trauma.

She trained abroad as part of the Lech Wałęsa Solidarity program, the THREAD program at Yale University, and took a course at the Warsaw Euro-Atlantic Summer Academy (WEASA).

Mendel won a competition for press secretary that was announced by President of Ukraine Volodymyr Zelenskyy on 30 April 2019. Winning from 4,000 other contestants, Mendel was appointed on 3 June 2019.

In October 2019, she was included in the rating of the 100 most influential women in Ukraine by Focus magazine.

In March 2021, Iuliia Mendel entered the top 100 most successful women in Ukraine by Novoe Vremya magazine, in the category “State officials”.

Spokesperson for the President of Ukraine 

As the spokesperson of the President of Ukraine Volodymyr Zelenskyy, she was given the task to lead the international direction. In particular, Zelenskyy gave interviews to leading European media, such as Le Monde, Der Spiegel, Gazeta Wyborcza, and he also appears on the covers of Time, p and The Guardian. In August 2020, Volodymyr Zelenskyy's interview with Euronews was published in 13 languages: English, Russian, German, French, Italian, Spanish, Portuguese, Hungarian, Greek, Albanian, Turkish, Arabic and Persian.

Iuliia Mendel also dealt with official statements that had a public response. In particular, statements were made by Volodymyr Zelenskyy about PrivatBank and Ukrainian oligarch Ihor Kolomoyskyi, where the Ukrainian President said that in the history of the bank "he will protect the interests of the state of Ukraine, the interests of every Ukrainian only", and that "Kolomoyskyi doesn’t have the authority to act on behalf of Ukraine or the Office of the President of Ukraine".

Mendel accompanied the President of Ukraine in all regional and international visits. She oversaw the information content of the official website of the President of Ukraine president.gov.ua, social networks, and work with the media.

In December 2019, she participated in the Normandy Format talks in Paris.

In July 2020, The National Interest published the article by Iuliia Mendel entitled "Why Ukraine Really Is On the Road to Reform", where she talks about new government initiatives, presidency of Volodymyr Zelenskyy, land reform in Ukraine, and IMF tranches.

On March 15, 2021, she made her debut as the host of the View from the Bankova program on the Dom TV channel, the launch of which became known only on the day of the first broadcast. Later it turned out that Mendel was not the host of the program, but one of the speakers from the Office of the President of Ukraine and other colleagues in power would also appear on the air of the program.

Article with allegations about Biden
Mendel had worked as a journalist, and was a coauthor with Kenneth P. Vogel of an article published in The New York Times on 1 May 2019.
The article detailed how in 2016, then-Vice President Biden successfully pushed Ukraine to oust Viktor Shokin, the country’s top prosecutor who’d been criticized by the U.S. as an impediment to corruption reform. The story suggested the possibility that Biden was motivated to push for Shokin’s removal because the prosecutor investigated the head of Burisma Holdings, a Ukrainian energy company where the veep’s son Hunter Biden was a board member.

Conflict of interest 
In June 2019, CNN released a story about the conflict of interest of Mendel, who wrote a story for The New York Times in May while she was a candidate for the government position and kept it secret from the newspaper that she applied for the position. According to Ari Isaacman Bevacqua, a spokesperson for The Times, "had Mendel informed editors of her job application, they would not have given her that assignment, and we would have stopped working with her immediately given this serious conflict of interest".

After the article was published, Iuliia Mendel stated that there was no conflict of interest, in her statement for CNN:

References

External links

 
 

1986 births
Living people
People from Kherson Oblast
Taras Shevchenko National University of Kyiv alumni
Ukrainian women journalists
21st-century journalists
Press Secretaries of the President of Ukraine